At the National Grid is an album released in 2005 by New Zealand band The Bats. It was their first album for ten years and the first to be released on a New Zealand label other than Flying Nun.

Recording and release
The rhythm tracks were recorded to analogue at The National Grid studio, in Christchurch, New Zealand. The tracks were then digitised with overdubs and mixing by Paul Kean with input from the band.

In New Zealand, The Bats released the album on their own newly formed Pocket Music label. It was released in the US by Magic Marker, in Germany by Little Teddy (with different artwork and also on vinyl), in the UK by Egg Records, and in Australia by Reverberation.

Reception
The album generally received very positive reviews. Tim Sendra at Allmusic gave it 4 stars, adding "...having the group back at such a high level is as refreshing as a plunge into an ice-cold mountain stream." It got airplay on many college radio stations in the US, leading to an appearance at Austin's SXSW Festival in 2006.

Track listing

Personnel
Malcolm Grant - drums
Paul Kean - bass, guitar, backing vocals
Robert Scott - guitar, vocals, piano
Kaye Woodward - guitar, bass, vocals

Also credited:
Alastair Galbraith - violin (tracks 6 & 12)
John Kelcher - engineer

References

2005 albums
The Bats (New Zealand band) albums
Dunedin Sound albums